A New Life is a Chinese drama in Singapore which aired in 2005. It is about how a blue-collar worker and his three bosom friends manage to overcome obstacles together.

Plot

Zhang Youfu (Christopher Lee) is an average joe who stopped schooling from a very young age to join the workforce. However, as he is slow-witted and clumsy, many of his employers find his work performance wanting. However, he is optimistic by nature and does not hold a grudge. Following the death of his father Zhang Wancai (Yan Bingliang), the heavy burden of supporting his entire family consisting of his mother (Jin Yinji), his elder sister Zhang Zhenzhu (Carole Lin) and his elder brother Zhang Hongyun (Andrew Seow) falls squarely on his shoulder. This drama also depicts how he and his three bosom friends whom he befriended back in his army days, Lin Laifa (Darren Lim), Ah Gen (Hossan Leong) and Steven (Seth Ang), all face many challenges and difficulties in their lives.

Cast
Christopher Lee as Zhang Youfu
Yvonne Lim as Ah Mei
Darren Lim as Lin Laifa
Andrew Seow as Zhang Hongyun, Youfu's elder brother
Carole Lin as Zhang Zhenzhu, Youfu's elder sister
Ann Kok as Guo Jialing
Jin Yinji as Youfu's mother
Hossan Leong as Ah Gen
Eelyn Kok as Qiurong
Alan Tern as Ah Ler
Yan Bingliang as Zhang Dongcai, later renamed Zhang Wancai, a.k.a. Curry Cai, Youfu's father
Margaret Lee as Xiaoyan
Melody Chen as Ah Hua
May Phua as Xiuxiu
Seth Ang as Steven
Cheryl Chan as Laifa's younger sister
Lee Weng Kee as Jialing's father
Justina Low as Guo Jiayi, Jialing's elder sister
Timothy Nga as Michael
Sharon Wong as Michael's wife
Luis Lim Yong Kun as Ah Xing
Remus Teng as Richard
Benjamin Yeung Sheung Bun as Alex
Chua Lee Lian as Herself (Creator, Storyteller and Narrator of this Drama)

Star Awards 2005 Awards & Nominations

References

External links
A New Life (English)
A New Life (Chinese)

2005 television films
2005 films
Singapore Chinese dramas